Sati-ye Sofla (also Romanized as Sāţī-ye Soflá) is a village in Shaban Rural District, in the Central District of Meshgin Shahr County, Ardabil Province, Iran. At the 2006 census, its population was 188, in 38 families.

References 

Tageo

Towns and villages in Meshgin Shahr County